Manhood For Amateurs is a 2009 collection of essays by the American writer Michael Chabon.

Collection
The complete title of Chabon's collection is  Manhood for Amateurs: The Pleasures and Regrets of a Husband, Father, and Son. As the writer explains, the work discusses "being a man in all its complexity — a son, a father, a husband."  The collection was nominated for a 2010 Northern California Book Award in the Creative Nonfiction category.  This was Chabon's second published collection of essays and non-fiction. McSweeney's published Maps and Legends, a collection of Chabon's literary essays, on May 1, 2008.

Essays
Most of the essays previously appeared in GQ, The New York Times, and others.

Contents
The Losers' Club
William and I
The Cut
D.A.R.E.
The Memory Hole
The Binding of Isaac
To the Legoland Station
The Wilderness of Childhood
Hypocritical Theory
The Splendors of Crap
The Hand on My Shoulder
The Story of Our Story
The Ghost of Irene Adler
The Heartbreak Kid
A Gift
Faking It
Art of Cake
On Canseco
I Feel Good About My Murse
Burning Women
Verging
Fever
Looking for Trouble
A Woman of Valor
Like, Cosmic
Subterranean
X09
Sky and Telescope
Surefire Lines
Cosmodemonic
Boyland
A Textbook Father
The Omega Glory
Getting Out
Radio Silence
Normal Time
Xmas
The Amateur Family
Daughter of the Commandment

References

External links
Michael Chabon and Manhood for Amateurs on NPR's All Things Considered

2009 non-fiction books
American non-fiction books
Essay collections
Works by Michael Chabon
Masculinity